Bošnjak is a common surname in Bosnia, Croatia and Serbia. Etymologically, it is an archaic local demonym denoting people from the region of Bosnia as equivalent to the present-day English term "Bosnian". A closely related surname is Bošnjaković, which is a patronymic derivative of Bošnjak. The surname Bošnjak is carried by 6,731 people in Croatia (2011 census), and as such ranks 28th by frequency. It is one of the most common surnames in three counties of Croatia. In Serbia the surname is carried by 2,042 people, and as such ranks 496th by frequency.

It may refer to:
Armin Bošnjak (born 1994), Montenegrin footballer 
Branka Bošnjak (born 1956), Serbian architect and politician 
Branko Bošnjak (1923–1996), Croatian philosopher
Branko Bošnjak (born 1955), Yugoslav footballer 
Bruno Bošnjak (born 1983), Croatian snowboarder 
Domagoj Bošnjak (born 1995), Croatian Basketball player
Dragan Bošnjak (1956-2019), Serbian footballer
Dražen Bošnjak, American composer
Ernest Bošnjak (1876-1963), Yugoslavian cameraman, film director and printer
Ivan Bošnjak (born 1974), Serbian politician
Ivan Bošnjak (born 1979), Croatian footballer
Ivan Bošnjak (born 1982), Serbian basketball player
Jim Bosnjak, Croatian-Australian businessman and chairman of Westbus, Australia's largest privately owned bus operator
Marko Bošnjak (born 2004), Bosnian-Herzegovinian pop singer
Matea Bošnjak (born 1997), Croatian footballer
Petar Bošnjak (born 1974), Croatian footballer
Predrag Bošnjak (born 1985), Hungarian footballer of Serbian descent
Spomenko Bošnjak (born 1973), Bosnian Croat footballer
Strahinja Bošnjak (born 1999), Serbian footballer

See also
 Boshnak

References

Croatian surnames
Serbian surnames
Toponymic surnames
Montenegrin surnames
Bosnian surnames